The House at 505 Court Street is a historic residence located in Bellevue, Iowa, United States. It is one of over 217 limestone structures in Jackson County from the mid-19th century, of which 101 are houses. What differentiates this Gothic Revival style structure from most of the others is the "high style" decorative elements such as the vergeboards, and the brackets. Although the NRHP listing indicates that it was built in 1871, the property abstract indicates that it was more likely built in 1858. The 1½-story house follows an L-shaped plan. It features rather small coursed cut stone block with only a slight variation in size and shape, and dressed stone sills, lintels, and watertable. The house was listed on the National Register of Historic Places on August 30, 1991.

References

Houses completed in 1871
Gothic Revival architecture in Iowa
Houses in Jackson County, Iowa
National Register of Historic Places in Jackson County, Iowa
Houses on the National Register of Historic Places in Iowa
Bellevue, Iowa